Frank Henry Kerrigan (September 17, 1868 – February 9, 1935) was a United States district judge of the United States District Court for the Northern District of California. He also served for nearly 30 years as a California state court judge, and was an associate justice of the California Supreme Court from January 8, 1923, to February 11, 1924.

Education and career

Kerrigan was born in Contra Costa County, California, to Henry Kerrigan and Elizabeth Donlin, and attended the local schools. Kerrigan then studied at University of California, Hastings College of the Law and read law to enter the bar in 1889. From 1890 to 1900, Kerrigan was in private practice in San Francisco, California. During this time, from 1894 to 1900, he was also a justice of the peace in San Francisco, and in January 1896 was made presiding justice of the court. When he resigned from the city court, Governor Henry Gage named Percy V. Long as a replacement.

State judicial service

Kerrigan was elected a judge of the San Francisco County Superior Court from 1900 to 1906. In November 1900, he won election to a four-year unexpired term, at the same time future Supreme Court judges William P. Lawlor and M. C. Sloss won full terms on the Superior Court. In 1904, Kerrigan was re-elected to a new term on the trial bench. Following the 1906 San Francisco earthquake and fire, a test case was brought before Judge Kerrigan to establish land title since so many legal records were destroyed. Governor George Pardee appointed John A. Hosmer to Kerrigan's Superior Court seat when he went to the state appellate court.

In November 1906, Kerrigan was nominated on the Republican Party ticket and elected as an associate justice of the newly created California District Court of Appeals, First District. He held this seat from January 8, 1907 to January 7, 1923. The three judges elected in 1906 drew straws to determine length of term, and Kerrigan drew an eight-year term. In May 1907, Kerrigan was nearly run over by an automobile at the corner of Sutter and Gough Streets. In 1914, he ran successfully for re-election. In April 1920, he temporarily sat on the Supreme Court to fill the vacancy of Justice Lucien Shaw. At that time, Kerrigan sought the appointment to the open seat of Justice Henry A. Melvin, who died during his term. But Governor William Stephens named William A. Sloane to the position instead. Again, in November 1921, Kerrigan was a strong contender for appointment to the high court when Frank M. Angellotti retired, but he was not picked.

In November 1922, Kerrigan won election as an associate justice of the Supreme Court of California, serving from January 8, 1923, to February 11, 1924. In the election, he and Emmett Seawell replaced incumbent justices William Sloane and Charles A. Shurtleff.

Federal judicial service

Kerrigan was nominated by President Calvin Coolidge on January 21, 1924, to a seat on the United States District Court for the Northern District of California vacated by Judge William Cary Van Fleet. He was confirmed by the United States Senate on January 28, 1924, and received his commission the same day. In February 1932, he was the trial judge for the case seeking to block construction of the Golden Gate Bridge, in which he upheld the legality of the special purpose district. In September 1932, during Prohibition, he ruled bottles and bottle caps had potentially legal uses and were not in violation of the national dry laws. Kerrigan died in office on February 9, 1935, in San Francisco. In August 1935, President Franklin D. Roosevelt announced that Superior Court Judge Michael Joseph Roche would succeed Kerrigan, instead of Congressman Clarence F. Lea, who had sought the post.

Clubs

Kerrigan was an early bicycle aficionado, and was president of both the Associated Cycling Clubs in 1897, and the next year of the Bay City Wheelmen. In 1900, he was grandmaster of the 20-mile road race for the Baker & Hamilton Trophy. In 1904, he awarded the winner of the mile bicycle race the Frank Kerrigan cup. In December 1909, Kerrigan and his friends in the Olympic Club ran a four mile course capped by a mid-winter swim in the Pacific Ocean. He also belonged to the California Club, where he competed in tournament tennis. Kerrigan was a member of the Native Sons of the Golden West, and the Order of Eastern Star.

Personal life

On November 29, 1905, Kerrigan married Jessie McNab. The couple reconciled after a separation from 1915 to 1918, and in 1920 they divorced. They had two children, Stewart and Jane.

See also
 List of justices of the Supreme Court of California

References

Sources

External links
 Frank H. Kerrigan. California Supreme Court Historical Society.
 Past & Present Justices. California State Courts. Retrieved July 19, 2017.
 Past & Present Justices. California Court of Appeal, First District.

1868 births
1935 deaths
Justices of the Supreme Court of California
Judges of the United States District Court for the Northern District of California
United States district court judges appointed by Calvin Coolidge
20th-century American judges
University of California, Hastings College of the Law alumni
United States federal judges admitted to the practice of law by reading law
U.S. state supreme court judges admitted to the practice of law by reading law
Judges of the California Courts of Appeal
Superior court judges in the United States
California Republicans